Hits Now! is a 24-hour music format produced by Dial Global. Its playlist is composed of mostly Top 40 (CHR) music from artists such as Rihanna, Katy Perry, Taylor Swift, Bruno Mars, Ke$ha, The Black Eyed Peas, and Usher among others, that mainly targets listeners ages 18–49. Hits Now! is the only 24-hour CHR/Top 40 music format currently offered via satellite in the United States; Cumulus Media offers a Hot AC format, and Dial Global offers two (one Total and one Local).  However, ABC Radio offered a satellite-delivered CHR format in the early 1990s called "The Heat." 

The "Hits Now!", Jack FM, and KPIG formats were new to Dial Global in 2008 (KPIG has since been discontinued). From 2007 to 2008, a format known as "Rhythm Mix AC" aired in Hits Now!'s slot; Rhythm Mix AC was a rhythmic adult contemporary format inspired by formats such as MOViN. Prior to 2007, the slot was held by a soft adult contemporary music format, which had originated with Transtar.

As of 2020, Hits Now! is available only in a Local version from Dial Global. In June 2012, it was discontinued as a satellite-delivered live version through Dial Global Total.

External links 
- Info from Dial Global

American radio networks
Contemporary hit radio stations in the United States